The Hollywood Freeway chickens are a colony of feral chickens that live under the Vineland Avenue off-ramp of the Hollywood Freeway (U.S. Route 101) in Los Angeles, California. It is not definitively known how they came to be there, although news stories generally ascribe them to an overturned poultry truck.

Chickens underneath the Vineland off-ramp became local celebrities upon their arrival sometime around 1970. By 1976, the flock included about 50 of the chickens, described as Rhode Island Reds. They became known as "Minnie's chickens", named after Minnie Blumfield, an elderly retiree who fed them regularly.  When she became too frail to feed them, a young actress, Jodie Mann, with Actors and Others for Animals made arrangements to relocate the chickens. Nearly a hundred of the hens and roosters were relocated to a ranch in Simi Valley, California. But not every member of the flock was apprehended, and those that remained spawned a new population. Subsequent removal efforts in the following years all had a similar outcome.

The first colony at the Vineland ramp has spread and there is now a second colony at the Burbank ramp, two miles away.

The survival of the chicken colony and their spreading to another freeway ramp has inspired a short story by Terry Pratchett, "Hollywood Chickens".

Origin
Beginning in the 1980s, twenty years after the colony's arrival, various individuals started coming forward claiming to know the mystery of their origin. Among them:

In 1990, Jeff Stein of Granada Hills, California claimed that in 1968, when his wife Janet and her twin sister were 12, they learned that a nearby school that raised animals was closing and that its resident chickens would be killed. The twins scooped them up and succeeded in hiding them at home until the roosters started waking up every morning at 5 a.m. The chickens couldn't stay, so the girls hiked through a field to an open area near the freeway and deposited two pillowcases full of them there.
In 1992, a North Hollywood man who would give only his first name ("Michael") claimed that as a child he and his brother put their pet chickens under the freeway after neighbors repeatedly complained about them. "We were afraid to confess after (their numbers) got out of hand because we thought the city would bill us", he said.
The widely believed, but never verified explanation about an overturned poultry truck on the freeway resurfaced in 2000 when Joe Silbert of Laguna Hills, California claimed to be the driver of the legendary vehicle, saying, "I tried to avoid a lady who cut in front of me and I turned over. I was taking anywhere from 500 to 1,000 chickens back from the Valley to a slaughterhouse in L.A. They were all hens. We never picked up roosters. These were hens that had stopped laying. They would eat but not produce, so they were costing farmers money. Anyway, I had a crate of eggs on the seat beside me, and when I turned over, my head fell into the crate. But I wasn't hurt. I started chasing one chicken and it was on the TV news that night." A colony of hens without a rooster would not be able to reproduce, making this explanation rather dubious.

Nevertheless, there was at least one witness to the overturned poultry truck explanation.  A driver on the way to work in Glendale was proceeding south on the 5 Freeway when she spotted three cars off to the side of the road that had been involved in a multiple rear-end collision.  Blood and feathers were all over the freeway.  On the overpass right above the accident site was a truck loaded with poultry cages, and each cage contained multiple chickens.  Below, on the freeway, a smashed poultry cage was off to one side, and chickens could be seen walking around in the freeway median (which did not have walls at the time).

This peculiar chapter of Los Angeles history was going to be commemorated in 1984 with a large mural painted along the north wall of the Hollywood Freeway, but the mural was ultimately rejected for funding and not completed.

See also
List of individual birds 
Giuliani (turkey)
Zelda (turkey)
Reggie (alligator)

References

External links 
"Freeway Chickens" at Snopes.com
ABC News, Wolf Files "Cockfighting in the Year of the Rooster, Bird Battling and Nonviolent Tales of Chicken Fortitude"

Hollywood, Los Angeles
U.S. Route 101
Urban wildlife
Chickens